{{Infobox beverage
| name         = Tyskie
| image        = 
| caption      = Former and current design of Tyskie Gronie pale-lager beer bottle| type         = Beer
| abv          = 5.2 % (5% in the UK)
| proof        = 
| manufacturer = Tyskie Browary Książęce (Tychy Princely Brewery)
| style        = Pale lager
| og           = 
| fg           = 
| ibu          = 
| distributor  = Asahi Group Holdings
| origin       = Poland
| introduced   = 1629
| discontinued = 
| colour       = 
| flavour      = 
| ingredients  = 
| variants     = 
| related      = 
}}

Tyskie is a Polish brand of beer. Its name comes from the brewery located in the Upper Silesian town of Tychy. It is brewed by the Tychy Princely Brewery (Polish Tyskie Browary Książęce), part of the Kompania Piwowarska brewery group, which was acquired by Asahi Group Holdings in 2017.

Beers
The main brands are Tyskie Gronie (pale lager).

History
The brewery is one of the oldest in Europe. Beer has been produced in Tychy continuously for almost 400 years. From 1629, the brewery, then known in German as the "Fürstliche Brauerei Tichau" (Princely Brewery Tychy), was in the ownership of the German noble . Between 1918 and 1939, the brewery merged with neighbouring competing companies, but came under provisional administration of the Polish state intermittently from 1934 due to unpaid taxes. During World War II, the brewery was put under the management of the occupying authorities.

Types of beer produced
In its beginnings, the brewery produced three kinds of beer: mailings, yeast and tableware. Only the high quality beer was intended for sale, and the other two were a beer allowance drunk mainly by brewers and their families. In the early nineteenth century the brewery produced only two beverages: beer and Bavarian malt, both top-fermenting. Bavarian malt with a classical composition, saturated color was brown, sweet, and low-hopped. The standard favorite was the dark niskoekstraktowe, weak and only for immediate consumption. After the expansion of the brewery in the nineteenth century and the introduction of bottom-fermenting, they started to produce Tyskie lager, a relatively short Bavarian beer. The first beers were light and were sold under the Książęce brand. In the interwar period, popular brands from Tyskie were the Książęce Tyskie Pilsen (Princely Tychy Pilsner), the Książęce Tyskie Export, the Książęce Tyskie Beer full, and Tyskie Porter.

Export
Tyskie is one of the leading brands of beer in Poland, with around 18% of the Polish market. Tyskie also has a large export distribution through its parent company. The main export brands are Tyskie Gronie, a 5.0% pale lager Tyskie Gronie is 5.2% ABV in produced by Tychy Brewery Princely.

Marketing
Tyskie bottles are known for their distinctive white packaging. The label depicts a royal crown to commemorate John III Sobieski king of Poland, who was born in 1629, the same year the family von Promnitz established a brewery in the town of Tychy.

Tourism
In 2004, the Tyskie Brewing Museum was founded on the brewery premises in Tychy. The Tyskie Brewing Museum represents an important "anchor point" of the European Route of Industrial Heritage in Poland.

Honors

In 2002, Tyskie Gronie won The Brewing Industry International Awards, receiving the two most prestigious awards - Gold Medal and Grand Prix.

In 2005 in Munich at a global beer fair hosted by Drink Tec, Tyskie again received the Grand Prix.

In 2011 Tyskie received the Gold Medal du Monde Selection – International Institute for Quality Selections.

See also
Polish beer
Tychy Brewery

References

Asahi Breweries
Beer brands of Poland